Rõuge is a small borough in Võru County in southeastern Estonia. It is the administrative centre of Rõuge Parish.

References

External links 
Satellite map at Maplandia.com

Boroughs and small boroughs in Estonia
Kreis Werro